Song Dandan (born 25 August 1961) is a Chinese skit and sitcom actress.

Biography
Song was born in Beijing, on August 25, 1961, to a highly educated family. Her father Song Gong was vice chairman of Beijing Federation of Literary and Art Circles. Her brother Song Beisha (born 1951) was vice governor of Shanxi and vice chairman of All-China Federation of Industry and Commerce.

She was trained and started as a drama actress. But it was her skit debut, A Date with Slug, in 1989 CCTV New Year's Gala that brought her immediate success. Afterwards she costarred first with Huang Hong, then with her successful partner Zhao Benshan in many Gala show skits. Some of her roles included "Anti-family plan Guerilla", and "Yesterday, today and Tomorrow". On television her most famous role was in I Love My Family (我爱我家). In recent years, Home with Kids (家有儿女) is also a notable sitcom she starred in.

Song Dandan also has a cameo role in House of Flying Daggers.

Personal life
Song was married three times. In 1989, she was married to director Ying Da, the couple has a son named Ying Batu. They divorced amicably in 1997. In that same year, she married her third husband, Zhao Yuji, was a top executive at one of China's largest steel companies, Shougang Group, and moved later to real-estate development and equity investment. Her stepdaughter, from Zhao's previous marriage, is the film director Chloé Zhao.

Filmography

Television

Pieces

Drama

Film

References

1961 births
Living people
Chinese television actresses
Chinese film actresses
Chinese stage actresses
Actresses from Beijing
20th-century Chinese actresses
21st-century Chinese actresses